Luis Fernando Espino Vazquez (born 4 January 1997) is a Mexican footballer who plays as a midfielder.

Career
After time in Mexico with Universidad Autónoma de Zacatecas and Club Atlas Premier, Espino moved to United Soccer League side Sacramento Republic on 14 September 2017.

References

External links
 

1997 births
Living people
Association football midfielders
Universidad Autónoma de Zacatecas FC footballers
Sacramento Republic FC players
Liga Premier de México players
Tercera División de México players
USL Championship players
Mexican expatriate footballers
Expatriate soccer players in the United States
Mexican expatriate sportspeople in the United States
Atlas F.C. footballers
Footballers from Coahuila
Mexican footballers
Sportspeople from Torreón